Things to Come (also known in promotional material as H. G. Wells' Things to Come) is a 1936 British black-and-white science fiction film from United Artists, produced by Alexander Korda, directed by William Cameron Menzies, and written by H. G. Wells. The film stars Raymond Massey, Edward Chapman, Ralph Richardson, Margaretta Scott, Cedric Hardwicke, Maurice Braddell, Derrick De Marney, and Ann Todd.

H. G. Wells conceived his treatment as "a new story" meant to display the "social and political forces and possibilities" that he had outlined in his 1933 book The Shape of Things to Come, a work he considered less a novel than a "discussion" in fictional form that presented itself as the notes of a 22nd-century diplomat. The film was also influenced by previous works, including his 1897 story "A Story of the Days to Come" and his 1931 work on society and economics, The Work, Wealth and Happiness of Mankind. The cultural historian Christopher Frayling called Things to Come "a landmark in cinematic design".

Synopsis
In 1940, businessman John Cabal, living in the city of Everytown in southern England, cannot enjoy Christmas Day as the news speaks of possible war. His guest, Harding, shares his worries, while another friend, the over-optimistic Pippa Passworthy, believes that it will not come to pass, and if it does, it will accelerate technological progress. An aerial bombing raid on the city that night results in general mobilisation and then global war with the unnamed enemy. Cabal becomes a Royal Air Force pilot and serves bravely, even attempting to rescue an enemy pilot he has shot down.

The war continues into the 1960s, long enough for the people of the world to have forgotten why they are fighting. Humanity enters a new dark age. Every city in the world in ruins, the economy has been devastated by hyperinflation, and there is little technology left other than greatly depleted air forces. A pestilence known as "wandering sickness" is inflicted by aerial bombing and causes its victims to walk around aimlessly in a zombie-like state before dying. The plague kills half of humanity and extinguishes the last vestiges of government.

By 1970, the warlord Rudolf, known as the "Boss", has become the chieftain of what is left of Everytown and eradicated the pestilence by shooting the infected. He has started yet another war, this time against the "hill people" of the Floss Valley to obtain coal and shale to render into oil for his ragtag collection of prewar biplanes.

On May Day that year, a sleek new monoplane lands in Everytown, startling the inhabitants who have not seen a new aircraft in many years. The pilot, a now elderly John Cabal, emerges and proclaims that the last surviving band of engineers and mechanics have formed a civilization called "Wings Over the World". They are based in Basra, Iraq and have outlawed war and are rebuilding civilisation throughout the Near East and the Mediterranean. Cabal offers the Boss the opportunity to join Wings, but he immediately rejects the offer and takes Cabal prisoner, forcing him to repair the obsolete biplanes airworthy. 

With the assistance of Cabal, the Boss's disillusioned mechanic Gordon contacts Wings Over the World. Gigantic flying wing aircraft arrive over Everytown and saturate its population with a "Gas of Peace" that temporarily renders them unconscious. The people awaken to find themselves under the control of Wings Over the World and the Boss dead from a fatal allergic reaction to the gas. Cabal promises them that Wings Over the World will usher in a new age of progress and peace.

Under Cabal's guidance, Wings Over the World quickly rebuilds civilization to even greater heights. By 2036, a stable mankind is now living in modern underground cities, including the new Everytown, and civilisation is at last devoted to peace and scientific progress. All is not well, however. The sculptor Theotocopulos incites the populace to demand a "rest" from all the rush of progress, symbolised by the coming first crewed flight around the Moon. When the mob threatens to destroy the space gun that will launch the ship to the moon, Oswald Cabal (the grandson of John Cabal and current head of government) is forced to move the launch ahead of schedule. 

Oswald Cabal's daughter Catherine and fellow scientist Maurice Passworthy are the astronauts. As the projectile is just a tiny light in the immense night sky, Cabal debates the desirability of human progress with Passworthy's anxious father. To Passworthy's concerns that humanity shall never be able to rest, Cabal retorts that humans have no choice but to conquer the universe and its mysteries: "All the universe or nothingness? Which shall it be, Passworthy? Which shall it be?"

Cast

 Raymond Massey as John Cabal/Oswald Cabal
 Edward Chapman as Pippa Passworthy/Raymond Passworthy
 Ralph Richardson as Rudolf a.k.a. The Boss
 Margaretta Scott as Roxana Black/Rowena Cabal
 Cedric Hardwicke as Theotocopulos
 Maurice Braddell as Dr Edward Harding
 Sophie Stewart as Mrs Cabal
 Derrick De Marney as Richard Gordon
 Ann Todd as Mary Gordon
 Pearl Argyle as Catherine Cabal
 Kenneth Villiers as Maurice Passworthy
 Ivan Brandt as Morden Mitani
 Anne McLaren as Child (2036)
 Patricia Hilliard as Janet Gordon
 Charles Carson as Great-Grandfather (2036)
 Patrick Barr as World Transport official
 John Clements as Enemy pilot
 Anthony Holles as Simon Burton (credited as "Antony Holles")
 Allan Jeayes as Mr. Cabal (1940)
 Pickles Livingston as Horrie Passworthy
 Abraham Sofaer as Wadsky

Cast notes
Theotocopulos's scenes were originally shot with Ernest Thesiger. Wells found his performance to be unsatisfactory, so he was replaced with Cedric Hardwicke and the footage reshot.

Terry-Thomas, who would become known for his comic acting, has an uncredited appearance as an extra in the film, playing a "man of the future."  It was his seventh film appearance.

Margaretta Scott is credited with the dual role of Roxana Black and Rowena Cabal, but the latter character does not appear in the longest surviving cut of the film.

Production
Things to Come sets out a future history from 1940 to 2036. In the screenplay, or "treatment" that Wells published in 1935, before the film was released, the story ends in "A.D. 2054".

Wells is sometimes incorrectly assumed to have had a degree of control over the project that was unprecedented for a screenwriter. Posters and the main title bill the film as "H. G. Wells' Things to Come", with "an Alexander Korda production" appearing in smaller type. In fact, Wells ultimately had no control over the finished product, with the result that many scenes, although shot, were either truncated or not included in the finished film. The rough-cut reputedly ran to 130 minutes; the version submitted to the British Board of Film Censors was 117m 13s; it was released as 108m 40s (later cut to 98m 06s) in the UK, and 96m 24s in the United States (see below for later versions). Wells's script (or "film treatment") and selected production notes were published in book form in 1935 and reprinted in 1940 and 1975. An academic edition annotated by Leon Stover was published in 2007. The script contains many scenes that were either never filmed or no longer exist, although the extant footage also includes scenes not in the published script (e.g. the Boss's victory banquet after the capture of the colliery).

Wells originally wanted the music to be recorded in advance, and have the film constructed around the music, but this would have impeded editing, and so the score, by Arthur Bliss, was fitted to the film afterwards in a more conventional way. A concert suite drawn from the film has remained popular; as of 2015, numerous recordings of it were still in print.

The film was made at Denham Film Studios, while the site was still under construction.

After filming had already begun, the Hungarian abstract artist and experimental filmmaker László Moholy-Nagy was commissioned to produce some of the effects sequences for the re-building of Everytown. Moholy-Nagy's approach was partly to treat it as an abstract light show, but only some 90 seconds of material was used, e.g. a protective-suited figure behind corrugated glass. In the autumn of 1975 a researcher found a further four sequences which had been discarded.

The art design in the film is by Vincent Korda, brother of the producer. The futuristic city of Everytown in the film is based on London: a facsimile of St Paul's Cathedral can be seen in the background.

Reception
Things to Come was voted the ninth best British film of 1936 by Film Weeklys readers. It was the 16th most popular film at the British box office in 1935–36. In 2005, it was nominated for the AFI's 100 Years of Film Scores, a list of the top 25 film scores unveiled by the American Film Institute.

Review aggregator website Rotten Tomatoes reports an approval rating of 93%, based on 28 reviews, with an average rating of 7.46/10. The site's consensus read:, "Eerily prescient in its presentation of a dystopian future, Things to Come's special effects may be somewhat dated, but its potent ideas haven't aged at all."

Writing for The Spectator in 1936, Graham Greene gave the film a mixed review. Although he made it clear that "a third of the film is magnificent", he felt that the second third (as the world of tomorrow reverts to barbarism and anarchy) seemed implausible, and began to lose interest with the introduction of the "Great Conspiracy" (an international force of airmen bent on restoring Earth's former glory) in the last third of the film. The optimism and idealism comes off as naive for him.

Science fiction historian Gary Westfahl has stated, "Things to Come qualifies as the first true masterpiece of science fiction cinema, and those who complain about its awkward pace and uninvolving characters are not understanding Wells's message, which is that the lives and actions of individuals are unimportant when compared to the progress and destiny of the entire human race". He also considered that "the film's episodic structure and grand ambitions make it the greatest ancestor of Stanley Kubrick's 2001: A Space Odyssey".

Indeed, during early development of what would become 2001, co-writer Arthur C. Clarke had Kubrick watch Things to Come as an example of a grounded science fiction film; Kubrick, however, disliked it. After seeing 2001, Frederik Pohl complained in a 1968 Galaxy editorial:

Duration, releases, and surviving versions
The rough cut of the film was 130 minutes in length, while the version submitted for classification by the British Board of Film Censors (BBFC) was 117m 13s. By the time of the 21 February 1936 UK premiere and initial release, this had been reduced to 108m 41s, while the American print premiered on 18 April 1936 was further cut to 96m 31s. By late 1936, a 98m 07s print was in circulation in the UK, and a 76m 07s print was resubmitted for classification by the BBFC and was passed – after further cuts – at 72m 13s for a reissue  in 1943 by Exclusive Films, a film distribution company co-founded by William Hinds.

The 96m 31s American print was cut down to 93m 19s by the removal of three sections of footage for a reissue by British Lion Films in 1948, and subsequently to 92m 44s by the removal of one more segment. A continuity script exists for a version of approximately 106m 04s, which contains all the material in the 96m 31s and 92m 44s versions, plus a number of other sequences. It is not known if a version of this duration was actually in circulation at any time, or if it was simply an intermediate stage between the premiere and release versions.

For many years, the principal surviving version of the film was the 92m 44s print (in countries using PAL or SECAM video systems, it runs to 89m exactly). From at least the late-1970s until 2007, this was the only version "officially" available from the rights holders in the UK.

In the United States, although the 92m 44s version was most prevalent, a version was also in circulation that included the four pieces of footage that were in the 96m 31s print, but not the 92m 44s version, although due to other cuts, actually ran shorter than the latter.

Home media
A cut version of the 92m 44s print was digitally restored and colourised by Legend Films, under the supervision of Ray Harryhausen (who had no connection with the making of the film) and released on DVD in the United States in early 2007.

In May 2007, Network DVD in the UK released a digitally restored copy of the 96m 31s version, the longest version remaining of the film. The two-disc set also contains a "Virtual Extended Version" with most of the missing and unfilmed parts represented by production photographs and script extracts. In 2011 Network released an updated and expanded version of this edition on Blu-ray in HD.

The Criterion Collection released the 96m 31s print on DVD and Blu-ray in North America on 18 June 2013. This includes the unused Moholy-Nagy footage as an extra.

Copyright status
Although the film lapsed into the public domain in the US in 1964 due to non-renewal, copyright remained in force in the UK, the European Union, and elsewhere. In the UK, copyright for films as "dramatic works" subsists for seventy years after the end of the year of release, or the death of either the director, the writer (or author of original story), or the composer of original music, whichever is the latest. As the composer, Arthur Bliss, did not die until 1975, copyright will not expire until after 31 December 2045. The current copyright holder is ITV Global Entertainment Ltd., while the longest surviving original nitrate print is held by the BFI National Archive, a copy of the 96m 31s print donated by London Films to the newly formed National Film Library in March 1936.

The film came back into copyright in the US in 1996 under the Uruguay Round Agreements Act (URAA), which, among other measures, amended US copyright law to reinstate copyright on films of non-US origin if they were still in copyright in their country of origin. The URAA was subsequently challenged in Golan v. Gonzales, initially unsuccessfully, later with partial success, but the challenge was ultimately defeated in Golan v. Holder and a new principle established that international agreements could indeed restore copyright to works which had previously come into the public domain.

See also
 The Man Who Could Work Miracles, a 1937 film based on Wells short story of the same name
 H. G. Wells' The Shape of Things to Come, a 1979 Canadian space opera film
 List of incomplete or partially lost films
 1936 in science fiction

References

Bibliography

External links
 
 
 
 
 Things to Come website by film expert Nick Cooper
 

1936 films
1930s science fiction war films
1930s dystopian films
British aviation films
British black-and-white films
British science fiction war films
British epic films
Films based on works by H. G. Wells
Films directed by William Cameron Menzies
Films produced by Alexander Korda
Films set in 1940
Films set in the 1940s
Films set in 1966
Films set in 1967
Films set in the 1960s
Films set in 1970
Films set in the 1970s
Films set in 2036
Films set in the future
London Films films
British post-apocalyptic films
Films with screenplays by H. G. Wells
Utopian films
Future history
Films shot at Station Road Studios, Elstree
1930s English-language films
1930s British films